Tulbaghia violacea, known as society garlic (also known as pink agapanthus, wild garlic, sweet garlic, spring bulbs, or spring flowers) is a species of flowering plant in the family Amaryllidaceae, indigenous to southern Africa (KwaZulu-Natal and Cape Province), and reportedly naturalized in Tanzania and Mexico.

Cultivation
When grown as an ornamental, this plant requires some protection from winter frosts. This species and the cultivars ‘Purple Eye’ and ‘Silver Lace’, with cream-margined leaves, have all gained the Royal Horticultural Society’s Award of Garden Merit.

Treatment of seeds with a smoke solution has been shown to increase the leaf mass and height of T. violacea seedlings. Seeds exposed to aerosol smoke was also shown to lead to a higher seedling survival percentage.

Edible uses
T. violacea leaves are eaten as a substitute for chives and garlic. In South Africa, Zulu people eat the leaves and flowers as a leaf vegetable like spinach or for seasoning meat and potatoes.

Medicinal uses
Tulbaghia violacea is used locally as a herbal remedy/medicine to treat several ailments.

Due to increasing evidence of its potential as an antifungal agent, large-scale commercialization is anticipated. However, this may make the Tulbaghia genus threatened as it is susceptible to overuse.

Safety and toxicity
Some fatalities and symptoms like gastro-enteritis, abdominal pain, cessation of gastro-intestinal peristalsis, sloughing of the intestinal mucosa, and contraction of the pupils, have been implicated in medication prepared with T. violacea. There has been speculation that T. violacea may cause poisonings but tests on rabbit showed no negative effects. It is possible that reported adverse effects are due to extensive use and/or high dosages of the plant. Adverse effects are generally assumed to be associated with the steroidal saponins and/or the sulphur compounds.

Ncube et al. (2011) found that the leaves and flowers of the plant are edible as vegetables. Elgorashi et al. (2003) used the Ames and VITOTOX tests and found that these parts (leaves and flowers) are non-toxic.

Odor
It may smell like marijuana or skunk to those familiar with either smell.  There have been instances in which concerned neighbors have contacted the police about the smell of cannabis in the neighborhood only to find out that the culprit was actually lemon verbena or society garlic.

Pictures

References

External links

Allioideae
Plants described in 1837
Plants used in traditional African medicine
Garden plants
Endemic flora of South Africa